Atie may refer to:

 Atie Voorbij (born 1940), a Dutch butterfly swimmer
 Atie Ridder-Visser (1914–2014), a Dutch resistance fighter during World War II
 Attie (disambiguation)
 Attiyah (disambiguation)